Mount Airy is a historic home located in Bedford County, Virginia, near Leesville. It was built between about 1797 and 1800, and is a two-story, frame, hall-parlor plan house from the Federal period. It has a gable roof and exterior end chimneys. The house received several additions to the side and rear and the front entrance was altered about 1910. The interior retains most of its early woodwork, including a handsomely paneled hall. Also on the property are a contributing smokehouse and family cemetery.

It was listed on the National Register of Historic Places in 1990.

References

Houses on the National Register of Historic Places in Virginia
Federal architecture in Virginia
Houses completed in 1800
Houses in Bedford County, Virginia
National Register of Historic Places in Bedford County, Virginia
1800 establishments in Virginia